= Brett's hypothesis =

Brett's hypothesis also known as the heat-invariant hypothesis or Brett's heat-invariant hypothesis proposes that upper thermal tolerance limits are less variable geographically than lower thermal tolerance limits. This hypothesis was originally proposed for fish but lately has been supported by studies with reptiles, amphibians, and aquatic insects. Three different mechanisms are proposed for the existence of this large-scale pattern of thermal tolerance limits variation:

- A constrained evolutionary potential of upper thermal tolerance limits
- The buffering effects of thermoregulatory behaviour has greater potential to face heat rather than cold stress
- Resolution of thermal data used

== Global versus local scales in Brett's hypothesis ==
While Brett's hypothesis has been strongly supported at global scales, heat tolerance seems to respond differently to smaller-scale climatic and habitat factors. For instance, lizards from the Iberian Peninsula show higher variation in upper thermal tolerance limits than in lower thermal tolerance limits. Similar results are found in adult frogs, tadpoles, and dragonfly larvae at local scales.
